The 2009 Australia national rugby union Tour  was a series of seven matches played by the Australia national rugby union team in November 2009.
The "Wallabies " didn't obtain their goal (the Grand Slam) drawing the match with Ireland, and losing surprisingly to Scotland.
The tour was preceded by a match against All Blacks for the Bledisloe Cup

The Matches 
Scores and results list Australia's points tally first.

Matches

New Zealand

Gloucester (un-capped)

England

Ireland

 Ireland captain Brian O'Driscoll became the 11th player in history to make his 100th Test appearance.

Scotland

Cardiff Blues (un-capped)

Wales

Squad
The 35-man touring party was announced on 8 October 2009.

On 28 October, Tyrone Smith was called up to replace the injured Rob Horne.

After Berrick Barnes was ruled out with an injury sustained in training Brumbies, fly-half Matt To'omua was called up to cover for him.

Note: Caps and date of ages are to opening tour match on 31 October 2009.

Coaching staff
Head Coach -  Robbie Deans
Assistant Coach -  Jim Williams
Skills Coach -  Richard Graham
High Performance Director -  David Nucifora

Statistics
Key
Con: Conversions
Pen: Penalties
DG: Drop goals
Pts: Points

References

2009
2009
2009
2009
2009
2009–10 in European rugby union
2009–10 in Irish rugby union
2009–10 in English rugby union
2009–10 in Welsh rugby union
2009–10 in Scottish rugby union
2009 in Australian rugby union